The Henry J. Barnes House, at 144 N. Bardstown Rd. in Mt. Washington, Kentucky, was built in 1885.  It was listed on the National Register of Historic Places in 1993.

It is a two-story double-pile four-bay "weatherboarded Cumberland form building with a two-tiered front porch."

References

Houses on the National Register of Historic Places in Kentucky
Victorian architecture in Kentucky
Italianate architecture in Kentucky
Residential buildings completed in 1885
National Register of Historic Places in Bullitt County, Kentucky
1885 establishments in Kentucky
Houses in Bullitt County, Kentucky